Paithan Assembly constituency is one of the 288 Vidhan Sabha (legislative assembly) constituencies of Maharashtra state in western India.

Overview
Paithan is part of the Jalna Lok Sabha constituency along with five other Vidhan Sabha segments, namely Badnapur, Jalna and Bhokardan in Jalna district and Silod and Phulambri in the Aurangabad district.

Members of Legislative Assembly
 1990: Babanrao Wagchaure, Shiv Sena
 1995: Sandipanrao Bhumre, Shiv Sena
 1999: Sandipanrao Bhumre, Shiv Sena
 2004: Sandipanrao Bhumre, Shiv Sena
 2009: Sanjay Waghchaure, Nationalist Congress Party
 2014: Sandipanrao Bhumre, Shiv Sena
 2019: Sandipanrao Bhumre, Shiv Sena

Election results

Assembly Elections 2004

Assembly Elections 2009

Assembly Elections 2014

Assembly Elections 2019

References

Assembly constituencies of Maharashtra
Aurangabad district, Maharashtra
Year of establishment missing